"What's a Girl to Do?" is the follow-up single to the previous Australian hit "Sister" by Australian sisters/band Sister2Sister. The song reached number five in Australia, number 25 in New Zealand, and number 61 in the United Kingdom. It is featured on the 2000 teen film Bring It On.

Chart performance
In Australia, the single debuted at number 10, staying there for two weeks before falling to number 11. It then climbed to its peak of number five and stayed there for two weeks before falling out of and rising back into the top 50. It spent a total of 20 weeks (like its predecessor) in the top 50.

In New Zealand the single debuted at number 40 before falling to number 44, then peaking at number 25 and falling out the next week. It then re-entered two weeks later at number 30, then fell out for the last time, bringing its top 50-week total to four.

In the United Kingdom, the single debuted at number 61, and fell out the next week.

Track listings
Australian CD single
 "What's a Girl to Do?"
 "What's a Girl to Do?" (Urban Mix)
 "Sister" (Urban Mix)
 "Sister" (Tuff Twins Mix)
 "Falling for You"

UK CD1
 "What's a Girl to Do?"
 "What's a Girl to Do?" (Allmighty Remix radio edit)
 "Falling for You"
 "What's a Girl to Do?" (Miami video)

UK CD2
 "What's a Girl to Do?"
 "What's a Girl to Do?" (John 00 Fleming Remix)
 "What's a Girl to Do?" (Urban Mix)
 "What's a Girl to Do?" (Australian video)

Charts

Weekly charts

Year-end charts

Certifications

Release history

References

1999 songs
2000 singles
Mushroom Records singles
Sister2Sister songs
Songs written by Pam Reswick